The Italian Army Music Band is an Italian military band based in Rome which represents the Italian Army. It is currently the senior most military band in the Italian Armed Forces. It is subordinate to the Capital Military Command. The band is composed of 102 non-commissioned officers and officers, under a senior training officer and master conductor/concertmaster which directs the band and leads it during parades. The conductor since 2019 is Maj. Filippo Cangiamila.

History
The band was founded in Rome on February 1, 1964, by a decision of the General Staff of the Italian Army, with the direct aim of creating a single musical institution to represent the service branch in official ceremonies and public performances. At the time of its founding, it served as replacement for over 125 minor army bands that were then dissolved. Originally it was placed under the direct command of Granatieri di Sardegna division, although by December of that year, it became a largely autonomous unit, dependent on support from the Capital Military Command. Its first public performance took place on June 2, 1964 in Rome during the military parade in honor of the foundation of the Italian Republic.

Conductors
 Amleto Lacerenza (1964–1972)
 Francesco Sgritta (1972–1975)
 Marino Bartoloni (1975–1994)
 Domenico Cavallo (1994–1997)
 Fulvio Creux (1997–2013)
 Antonella Bona (2013–2019)
 Filippo Cangiamila (2019–present)

See also
Staff Band of the Bundeswehr
Musique de l’Artillerie
Gardemusik Wien
Italian Navy Band

References

Italian military bands
Italian Army
Military units and formations established in 1964
Musical groups established in 1964